Paul Franklin Henderson (born 17 November 1934) is a former president of the International Sailing Federation, renamed since as World Sailing, and is a member of the Canadian Olympic Hall of Fame.

Sailing career 
Living on Toronto Island around boats and sailing Henderson learned the basics of the sport, as well as the values and importance of sport early in life. He became a very active competitor in sailing, winning medals at World, North American and National Championships. He has the record of having competed in all the Canadian Olympic Sailing Trials from 1948 to 1984. Henderson has represented Canada at three Olympic Games: 1964 Enochima in the Flying Dutchman, 1968 Acapulco in the Finn and at the 1972 Schilksee as coach.

Palmeres
Gold Medals
 12 Canadian Championships including:
 International 14 - 1959
 Flying Dutchman - 1964, 1966, 1970
 Finn - 1967
 Star - 1979, 1980
 Soling - 1975
 5 United States titles including:
 International 14 - 1957, 1959
 470 - 1970
 Flying Dutchman - 1970
 Finn - 1967
 3 North Americans:
 Flying Dutchman - 1963
 Fireball - 1970
 Finn - 1966
 Worlds:
 International 14 - 1959

Silver Medal
 Flying Dutchman, Germany - 1962

Other Major Events
 Bermuda 1958 - Princess Elizabeth Trophy
 Holland 1962 - Prince Bernhard Trophy - Flying Dutchman

Sport management 
Henderson helped found the Water Rat Sailing Club in 1969 and the Outer Harbour Sailing Community, the Mooredale Sailing Club, the Outer Harbour Sailing and Catamaran Club, the St. Jamestown Sailing Club and the Hanlan Boat Club.

He was a member of the founding group that set up CORK (Canadian Olympic Regatta Kingston)

The first time Henderson represented Canada at the International Yacht Racing Union, was in 1970 to advise on the sailing venue for the 1976 Montreal Olympics. He stayed active for ISAF for over 30 years.

Henderson dedicated five years as a volunteer in his leadership of the Toronto Olympic Bid, to host the 1996 Olympic Games and was also consulted to the 2008 Olympic bid and to the 2010 Vancouver bid.

Henderson was elected President of the ISAF in 1994; the first non-European to ever hold this position.

He was on the IOC Sports and Environmental Commission and Women and Sport Commission. During his presidency sailing went from 18% women athletes in Atlanta 1996 to 35% in Athens 2004.

Positions held
 ISAF Volunteer Positions
 1978 - 1994 - Vice President
 1994 - 2004 - President
 IOC Appointments
 Member of IOC - 2000 -2004
 Executive Member - Association of Summer Olympic International Sports Federations
 Member IOC Sport and the Environment Commission
 Member IOC World Anti-Doping Agency
 Member IOC Women and Sport Committee
 Other Volunteer Positions
 President Toronto 1996 Olympic Bid Committee
 President Toronto Racquets Club 1972 to 1975
 Board Member Crescent School 1980 -1983
 Other Honours
 ISAF Beppe Croce 2005
 Canadian Olympic Hall of Fame - Builder Category 2001
 Ontario Sports Award - 2001
 Rolex Sailor of the Year - Canada 1994
 Councilor of Honour - Canadian Yachting Association
 Honorary Commodore, Royal Canadian Yacht Club
 MAFSI Foodservice Hall of Honour - 2002
 Honorary Member St James Town Sailing Club, Mimico Cruising Club
 Ambassador of the Vintage Yachting Games since 2011

Professional life
Henderson ran very successfully RG Henderson and Son, a well-known Restaurant maintenance and repair company.

Personal life
Henderson is married to Mary. They have two children, John and Martha; the latter represented Canada in the 2008 Olympics as crew member on the Canadian Yngling.

References

Sources
 
 

 
 

1934 births
Living people
Businesspeople from Toronto
Olympic sailors of Canada
Canadian male sailors (sport)
Sailors at the 1964 Summer Olympics – Flying Dutchman
Sailors at the 1968 Summer Olympics – Finn
International Olympic Committee members
Sportspeople from Toronto
University of Toronto alumni
Presidents of World Sailing
Canadian sports executives and administrators